Rydal is a village in Cumbria, England. It is a small cluster of houses, a hotel, and St Mary's Church, on the A591 road midway between Ambleside and Grasmere.

Historically part of Westmorland, Rydal is significant in the history of English Romantic literature. William Wordsworth lived at Rydal Mount from 1813 to 1850. Dr Thomas Arnold, notable headmaster of Rugby School, had a summer home at Fox How in nearby Under Loughrigg. Arnold's son, the poet Matthew Arnold, was a frequent visitor and a close friend of Wordsworth. At the northern end of Rydal Water is White Moss House, believed to be the only house owned by Wordsworth, which he bought for his son, Willie and which remained in the Wordsworth family until the 1930s.

Rydal is often a starting point for the Fairfield horseshoe, a hillwalking ridge hike.

See also
Rydal Mount
Rydal Water
Rydal Hall

References

External links
 Cumbria County History Trust: Rydal and Loughrigg (nb: provisional research only – see Talk page)

Villages in Cumbria
South Lakeland District